Martin Lloyd Love (born 30 March 1974) is a former Australian cricketer who played in five Test matches from 2002 to 2003. He was a right-handed batsman.

Early life
Love was educated at Mundubbera State School, Mundubbera High School and Toowoomba Grammar School. He graduated with a degree in physiotheraphy from The University of Queensland in 1997.

Cricket
He made 146 for Queensland in the 1994–95 Sheffield Shield final when the Bulls won their first 'Shield after 68 years in the competition. In 2002 he set a Durham record by making 251.  He improved on that with a 273 in 2003.

His Test debut was in the 2002–03 Ashes Series in Australia where he played in the 4th and 5th Tests, making 62*, 6*, 0 and 27. This was followed with a single Test in Barbados (36 & 2) and two Tests against Bangladesh in Australia in 2003 in which he made a duck and 100 not out. Martin Love signed a contract for Warwickshire CCC in October 2006, but injured himself before joining up with the squad and was subsequently replaced by Kumar Sangakkara

On Damien Martyn's return from injury, Love was dropped from the Test squad.

On 24 February, Love announced he would retire at the end of the 2008–09 Australian cricket season to pursue a career in physiotherapy. He posted a sublime 219 not out in his last home match, followed by 104 not out in his last Sheffield Shield innings against Victoria at Junction Oval. This gave Love the rare distinction of scoring an unbeaten century in both his final Test and first class innings.

References

External links 

1974 births
Living people
Australia Test cricketers
Queensland cricketers
Queensland cricket captains
Durham cricketers
Northamptonshire cricketers
People from Wide Bay–Burnett
Australian cricketers
Australian expatriate sportspeople in England